Magic to Go to My Star is K-Pop singer Lee Jung Hyun's third album, released in 2001.

Track listing
"Intro"
"수리수리 마수리" (Surisuri Masuri; Hocus Pocus)
"난 죽지 않아" (Nan Jukji Anha; I'll Never Die)
"Crying in the Mirror"
"미쳐" (Mi-Chyo; Crazy)
"No More Terror"
"프리즘" (Prism)
"Misty"
"Surprise Party"
"반" (Ban; Half)
"Set It Up Now"
"Anti Drug"
"French Kiss"
"Outro"

Miscellanea
 The picture featured on the album cover is a hologram.  The album includes a booklet of abstract photographs featuring a porcelain doll that resembles Lee Jung Hyun.
 "No More Terror" is a tribute to 9-11, featuring audio sampled from New York City emergency workers' radio transmissions and speeches by U.S. President George W. Bush.
 "Set It Up Now" was written by Lee Jung Hyun's fourth sister, Lee Hae-ok (이해옥).

2001 albums
Lee Jung-hyun albums